Charles de Lorraine, 4th Duke of Guise and 3rd Prince of Joinville (20 August 1571 – 30 September 1640), was the son of Henry I, Duke of Guise and Catherine of Cleves, and succeeded his father as Duke of Guise in 1588. Initially part of the Catholic league, he pledged his support for Henry IV of France and was made Admiral of the Levant by Louis XIII of France. After siding with the Queen Mother, Marie de' Medici, against Cardinal Richelieu, he fled to Italy with his family where he died in 1640.

Biography
He was born in Joinville, the son of Henry I, Duke of Guise and Catherine of Cleves. Originally styled the Chevalier de Guise, he succeeded as Duke of Chevreuse upon the death of his great-uncle Charles of Guise, Cardinal of Lorraine, a title he later resigned to his brother Claude.

After his father's assassination in 1588, Charles succeeded him as Duke of Guise, but was kept in prison in Tours for three years, escaping in 1591. While the Catholic League had great hopes for him, and considered placing him on the throne, he declared his support for Henry IV of France in 1594, for which Henry paid him four million livres and made him Governor of Provence. On 17 February 1596, Charles captured Marseille from the League, restoring it to the French crown.

During the reign of Louis XIII, Charles was created Grand Master of France and Admiral of the Levant.

Falling into disfavor with Cardinal Richelieu for siding with Marie de' Medici, he withdrew to Italy in 1631. His wife and younger children joined him in Florence, where the family was protected by the House of Medici. His sons François and Charles Louis died in Italy during these years of exile. Duke Charles himself died in Cuna in 1640. His widow and children (among them Marie, Mademoiselle de Guise) were permitted to return to France in 1643.

Family
On 6 January 1611 he married Henriette Catherine of Joyeuse (8 January 1585 – 25 February 1656). They had:
 François (3 April 1612 – 7 December 1639), Prince of Joinville, who died in Florence during the family's exile and was buried in the church of San Lorenzo and later reinterred at Joinville. He was deemed "the most accomplished prince of his day."
 Twin boys, who were very frail and sickly. They died on the same day.
 Henry II, Duke of Guise (1614–1664), Archbishop of Reims
 Marie, Duchess of Guise (1615–1688)
 A girl, called Mademoiselle de Joinville, who was born healthy but caught a cold in the winter of 1617 and died shortly thereafter.
 Charles Louis (15 July 1618 – 15 March 1637, who also died in Florence) and was buried at San Lorenzo and later at Joinville, styled Duke of Joyeuse
 Françoise Renée (10 January 1621 – 4 December 1682, Montmartre), Abbess of Montmartre
 Louis, Duke of Joyeuse (1622–1654), also Duke of Angoulême
 Roger (21 March 1624 – died 9 September 1653) called the Chevalier de Joinville and later the Chevalier de Guise, Knight of the Order of Malta, died of fever at Cambrai and buried near his ancestors at Joinville.

Ancestry

References

Sources

1571 births
1640 deaths
People from Haute-Marne
Princes of Joinville
Dukes of Chevreuse
104
Dukes of Joyeuse
Counts of Eu
Governors of Provence
Grand Masters of France
Charles
16th-century French people
17th-century French people